Kislov is a Russian male surname. Its feminine counterpart is Kislova. Notable people with the surname include:
Aleksandr Kislov (born 1984), Russian decathlete
Igor Kislov (born 1966), Ukrainian association football player
Aleksandra Kislova (born 1946), Russian chess master
Marina Kislova (born 1978), Russian sprinter
Yelizaveta Dementyeva (born Yelizaveta Kislova, 1928), Soviet sprint canoer

Russian-language surnames